Lotus Communications Corporation is a media company that owns numerous radio stations and a few TV stations, and is one of the largest privately owned radio station groups in the United States. Headquarters are located in Los Angeles, and the company's President and CEO is Howard Kalmenson.

Radio
, Lotus has a total of 34 stations in Arizona, California, and Nevada.

In August 2018, Lotus announced that it would acquire Scripps' Tucson and Boise clusters for $8 million. To comply with ownership limits due to its existing stations in Tucson, Lotus divested KQTH and KTGV.

In June 2021, Sinclair Broadcast Group agreed to sell KOMO (AM), KOMO-FM, KVI and KPLZ to Lotus Communications for $18 million. Sinclair retained KOMO-TV, plus rights to the KOMO call letters.

Arizona

Tucson 
 KFFN AM 1490
 KTKT AM 990
 KCMT FM 92.1
 KMXZ-FM 94.9
 KLPX FM 96.1
 KFMA FM 102.1

California

Los Angeles
 KWKW AM 1330
 KTMZ AM 1220
 KIRN AM 670
 KFWB AM 980

Bakersfield
 KWAC AM 1490
 KCHJ AM 1010
 KQKZ 92.1
 KIWI FM 102.9
 KPSL-FM 96.5

Fresno
 KGST AM 1600
 KSEQ FM 97.1
 KLBN FM 101.9
 KKBZ FM 105.1
 KHIT-FM 107.1

Sacramento
 KVMX AM 890
 KVMX-FM 92.1

Idaho

Boise 
 KRVB 94.9
 KQXR 100.3
 KJOT 105.1
 KTHI 107.1

Nevada

Las Vegas
 KENO AM 1460
 KRLV AM 920
 KOMP FM 92.3
 KXPT FM 97.1
 KWID FM 101.9
 KWWN AM 1100
 KLAV AM 1230
 KKGK AM 1340

Reno
 KPLY AM 630
 KFOY AM 1060
 KHIT AM 1450
 KTHX-FM 94.5
 KWEE FM 100.1
 KDOT FM 104.5
 KOZZ-FM 105.7

Washington

Seattle
 KVI AM 570
 KNWN AM 1000
 KNWN-FM 97.7
 KPLZ-FM 101.5

Television
All of Lotus' television stations are affiliated with Multimedios Television, Telemax & Mira TV.

 KHLM-LD channel 43, Houston, Texas
 KPHE-LD channel 44, Phoenix, Arizona

References

External links
 Lotus Home Page

Broadcasting companies of the United States
Television broadcasting companies of the United States
Radio broadcasting companies of the United States
Companies based in Los Angeles
Lotus Communications stations
Mass media companies established in 1962
American companies established in 1962